Doellingeria sericocarpoides, the southern tall flat-topped aster or southern whitetop aster, is a North American perennial forb native to the eastern United States. It ranges from eastern Texas and southeastern Oklahoma to northern Florida north as far as New York State, though uncommon in the northern part of that range.

Doellingeria sericocarpoides is a perennial up to 150 cm (5 feet) tall, spreading by means of underground rhizomes. It can sometimes produce as many as 200 small flower heads, each with 2-7 white ray florets and 4-20 yellow disc florets.

References

External links
photo of herbarium specimen at Missouri Botanical Garden, collected in Arkansas, type specimen of Doellingeria sericocarpoides

sericocarpoides
Flora of the Eastern United States
Plants described in 1898